The Ministry General Secretariat of Government (Segegob) is the cabinet-level administrative office charged with acting as the government's organ of communication. The principal function of the Minister Secretary General of Government and his or her staff is to serve as the spokesperson of the government. The current Minister Secretary General of Government is Camila Vallejo.

History
The position of the General Secretariat of Government was created in 1932, and the Ministry General Secretariat of Government was created in 1976 after a decree (Decreto Ley N° 1.385) which awarded ministerial rank to the General Secretariat of Government. The Ministry General Secretariat of Government was reorganized by different laws in 1991 and 1992 during the administration of Patricio Aylwin.

General Secretaries / Ministers

External links
Official site

Sources
  

General Secretariat of Government